Posterior ciliary arteries may refer to:

 Long posterior ciliary arteries
 Short posterior ciliary arteries